László Lakos (born 31 August 1945) is a Hungarian veterinarian and former politician, who served as Minister of Agriculture between 1994 and 1996.

References
 Bölöny, József – Hubai, László: Magyarország kormányai 1848–2004 [Cabinets of Hungary 1848–2004], Akadémiai Kiadó, Budapest, 2004 (5th edition).
 Zsigmond Király Főiskola - Jelenkutató Csoport

1945 births
Living people
People from Hajdú-Bihar County
Members of the Hungarian Socialist Workers' Party
Hungarian Socialist Party politicians
Agriculture ministers of Hungary
Members of the National Assembly of Hungary (1990–1994)
Members of the National Assembly of Hungary (1994–1998)